Batman: Arkham City is a 2011 action-adventure video game based on the DC Comics superhero Batman. Two music albums were released alongside the game: Batman: Arkham City – Original Video Game Score which contains the game's original score by Nick Arundel and Ron Fish and Batman: Arkham City – The Album containing songs by various mainstream artists.

Batman: Arkham City – Original Video Game Score
 

The Batman: Arkham City – Original Video Game Score was released on October 18, 2011, by WaterTower Music. The album features 19 tracks composed for the game. Ron Fish and Nick Arundel, composers for Batman: Arkham Asylum, returned to write music for Arkham City.

Batman: Arkham City – The Album

To accompany the original score, WaterTower Music also published Batman: Arkham City – The Album, featuring musical contributions to the franchise by various artists. The album was digitally released worldwide on October 4, 2011, via major electronic retailers iTunes and Amazon MP3. The iTunes deluxe edition included a portion of Arundel & Fish's original video game score 14 days before its standalone release. A physical audio CD release accompanied the digital version. The Batman: Arkham City Collector's Edition is also to include The Album via digital redemption, featuring an additional exclusive track. All 11 tracks were included on CD from retailer Best Buy.

On their contribution to the album, Claudio Sanchez from Coheed and Cambria said "I write in a very conceptual format with the stories that surround Coheed and Cambria, but Batman has a much larger, defined history and rules that go along with it" and that "my goal was to find universal themes from Batman's existing history to help give the lyrics legs and dimension so that the song could live within that world". Panic! at the Disco's involvement with the album was publicised on their website on September 22, 2011, with the announcement of their track "Mercenary".

References

Video game soundtracks
2011 soundtrack albums
Arkham City
WaterTower Music soundtracks